Critical Care Clinics is a quarterly peer-reviewed medical journal covering intensive care medicine. The editor-in-chief is John A. Kellum, Jr. (University of Pittsburgh).  It was established in 1985 and is published by Elsevier.

Abstracting and indexing
The journal is abstracted and indexed in:

According to the Journal Citation Reports, the journal has a 2016 impact factor of 1.927, ranking it 23rd out of 33 journals in the category "Critical Care Medicine".

References

External links

Elsevier academic journals
Emergency medicine journals
Publications established in 1985
English-language journals
Quarterly journals